Khwaja Moinuddin Chishti Language University (KMCLU), formerly Khwaja Moinuddin Chishti Urdu, Arabi-Farsi University (KMCUAFU) is a state university  based in Lucknow, Uttar Pradesh, India. Established in 2009, the university is named after Sufi saint Mu'in al-Din Chishti.

History 
The university was established in 2009 as "Uttar Pradesh Arabi Pharsi University", under the Uttar Pradesh Arabi Pharsi University Act, 2009. In 2010 the act was repealed and the university was reintroduced as "Uttar Pradesh Urdu, Arabi-Farsi University" under Uttar Pradesh State Universities (Amendment) Act, 2010. It was renamed "Manyavar Shri Kanshi Ram Ji Urdu, Arabi-Farsi University" in 2011 under Uttar Pradesh State Universities (Amendment) Act, 2011, to honor the politician and social reformer Kanshi Ram. About a year later it was renamed again "Khwaja Moinuddin Chishti Urdu, Arabi-Farsi University" in 2012, under Uttar Pradesh State Universities (Amendment) Act, 2012, in honor of Sufi saint Mu'in al-Din Chishti. In 2020, it was renamed a final time "Khwaja Moinuddin Chishti Language University" under Uttar Pradesh State Universities (Amendment) Act, 2020.

Anis Ansari was appointed the founder vice-chancellor (VC) of the university in April 2010. Mahrukh Mirza was appointed VC in October 2017. After vacating the position in October 2020, in January 2021, after all candidates for the VC position have been rejected, Vinay Kumar Pathak was appointed VC as an additional charge. Anil Kumar Shukla was appointed VC in April 2021. In January 2022, Alok Kumar Rai, VC of Lucknow University, was appointed VC as KMCLU as an additional charge.

References

External links
 

Universities and colleges in Lucknow
Universities in Uttar Pradesh
2009 establishments in Uttar Pradesh
Educational institutions established in 2009
Chishti Order